Ivan the Terrible (Ivan Grozniy) is a two-part Soviet epic historical drama film written and directed by Sergei Eisenstein. A biopic of Ivan IV of Russia, it was Eisenstein's final film, commissioned by Soviet Premier Joseph Stalin, who admired and identified with Ivan.

Part I was released in 1944; Part II, although it finished production in 1946, was not released until 1958, as it was banned on the order of Stalin, who became incensed over the depiction of Ivan therein.  Eisenstein had developed the scenario to require a third part to finish the story but, with the banning of Part II, filming of Part III was stopped; after Eisenstein's death in 1948, what had been completed of Part III was mostly destroyed.

The film is mainly in black-and-white, but contains a few colour scenes towards the end of Part II.

Plot

Part I
In the prologue Ivan's mother and her lover are murdered by the boyars. Later Ivan is enthroned as Grand Prince of Moscow.

Part I begins with Ivan's coronation as Tsar of all the Russians, amid grumbling from the boyars and silent jealousy from his cousin, Vladimir of Staritsa and especially from Vladimir's mother and Ivan's aunt, the evil-looking Evfrosinia Staritskaia. Ivan makes a speech proclaiming his intent to unite and protect Russia against the foreign armies outside her borders and the enemies within – a reference to the boyars, who are already seen as discontented with his coronation. Shortly after, Ivan marries Anastasia Romanovna and there is a wedding celebration. This causes him to lose the friendship of his two best friends, Prince Andrei Kurbsky and Fyodor Kolychev. The latter receives Ivan's permission to retire to a monastery, while Kurbsky attempts to resume his romance with the Tsarina, who repels his advances.

The marriage feast is interrupted by news of the burning of several boyar palaces, carried into the Tsar's palace by a mob of the common people who also complain that the Tsar is being led astray by the Tsarina's family (the Romanovs), the Glinskys and the Zakharins. Ivan calms the crowd, but is interrupted by envoys from the khanate of Kazan, who send him a ceremonial knife with the suggestion that he do himself a favor by using it to commit suicide. Ivan immediately proclaims that his kingdom is at war with Kazan.

The next scene shows the 1552 siege of Kazan, in which Ivan's army digs saps underneath the city and fills them with gunpowder. Kurbsky, nominally in command, is reprimanded by Ivan for senseless brutality (he ties Tatar prisoners to palisades within earshot of the walls of Kazan and tells them to shout to the city to surrender; the defending archers immediately shoot the prisoners). The city of Kazan falls to the Russian army.

During his return from Kazan, Ivan falls seriously ill and is thought to be on his deathbed; Orthodox priests come to give him the last rites before he dies. Ivan sends for his relatives and orders them to swear allegiance to his son, the infant Dmitri, reminding them of the need for a single ruler to keep Russia united. They demur, with Ivan's aunt, Evfrosinia Staritskaya, openly urging the others to swear allegiance to her son, Vladimir, instead. Emotionally overwrought, Ivan collapses and is thought dead. The relatives, celebrating, all begin to swear allegiance to Vladimir, the "boyar tsar" they have hoped for; meanwhile, Kurbsky is uncertain of his own loyalty, trying to decide between the two sides. However, when the Tsarina says, "Do not bury a man before he is dead", Kurbsky realizes that Ivan is still alive, and hurriedly swears his allegiance to Ivan's infant son, Dmitri. He is sent, as a reward, to the western border of the kingdom to defend against the Livonians and Poles. At the same time, Ivan dispatches Alexei Basmanov, a commoner he likes, to the south to take care of the Crimean border. The fact that Ivan promotes a commoner over them creates more discontent amongst the boyars.

The Tsarina now falls ill, and while Ivan is receiving bad news from all fronts, the boyars plot to kill her. Evfrosinia comes into the palace with a cup of wine hidden in her robes, in which she has put poison. Just as the royal couple receive word that Kurbsky has defected to the Livonians, Evfrosinia slips the cup of wine into the room and listens from behind a wall. The news that Kurbsky is a traitor gives the Tsarina a convulsion and Ivan, looking around for a drink to calm her, takes the poisoned wine and gives it to her.

The scene changes to show the dead Tsarina lying in state in the cathedral, with Ivan mourning beside her bier. While a monk reads biblical verses over the body, Ivan questions his own justifications and ability to rule, wondering if his wife's death is God's punishment on him. However, he pulls himself out of it, and sends for his old friend, Kolychev, the monk. At this point, Alexei Basmanov arrives, suggesting that Ivan instead surround himself with men he can really trust – common people, "iron men", the Oprichniki – and offers his own rather startled son, Fyodor, for service. Ivan accepts, and sets about recouping his losses. He abdicates and leaves Moscow, waiting until the people beg him to return, saying that he now rules with absolute power by the will of the people.

Part II
Part II opens in the court of King Sigismund of Poland, to whom Kurbsky swears allegiance. Sigismund promises to make Kurbsky ruler of Ivan's territories, once he exploits the tsar's absence by conquering them. The plan is foiled when an emissary announces that Ivan has returned to Moscow.

A flashback shows Ivan as a child, witnessing his mother being poisoned and removed, then as a young teenager standing up to the condescension of the boyars who want to rule over young Ivan's head. He begins by reforming the land distribution - he takes the boyars' lands, then reinstalls them as managers, increasing his own power at their expense. His friend, Kolychev, arrives, now the monk Philip; after a heated debate, Philip agrees to become metropolitan of Moscow, as long as Ivan gives him the right to intercede for condemned men. This is mutually agreed upon, but as soon as it is settled, Ivan, propelled by his lieutenant Malyuta Skuratov, finds a way around this: he executes condemned men quickly, before Philip can use his right. In this way he has three of Philip's kinsmen executed.

Fyodor Basmanov, the first of the Oprichniki, helps Ivan figure out that the Tsarina was poisoned, and both suspect Evfrosinia of poisoning the cup of water. Ivan orders Fyodor not to say anything about it until they are certain beyond doubt of her guilt.

The boyars, close to desperation, plead their case to Philip and eventually win him over. He vows to block Ivan's abuse of power, and confronts him in the cathedral while a miracle play is being presented. As the argument heats up, a small child, carried on the boyars’ shoulders next to Evfrosinia, calls out, asking whether this is the "terrible heathen king". Ivan, angry, proclaims that he will be exactly what they call him – terrible. He is now sure that Evfrosinia poisoned his wife, the Tsarina, and he has Philip seized. The boyars now decide that their only option is to assassinate Ivan, and the novice Pyotr is selected to wield the knife. Malyuta Skuratov arrives to invite Vladimir to a banquet with Tsar Ivan and the Oprichniki.

(From here, the film is in colour.) At the banquet, Ivan gets Vladimir drunk while the Oprichniki sing and dance around them; a tipsy Vladimir mentions that there is a plot to kill Ivan, and that he, Vladimir, is to replace him as Tsar. Fyodor Basmanov notices Pyotr, the assassin, leaving and signals to Ivan who, pretending surprise at Vladimir's revelation, suggests Vladimir try being Tsar for a while. He has the Oprichniki bring throne, orb, sceptre, crown and royal robes, and they all bow down to "Tsar Vladimir". Then Ivan tells Vladimir to lead them to the cathedral in prayer, as a Tsar should lead. (Back to black-and-white.) Hesitantly, Vladimir does.

In the cathedral, the assassin runs up, stabs the mock Tsar and is immediately seized by Fyodor and Malyuta. Evfrosinia arrives, jubilant at the apparent death of Ivan, until she sees Ivan alive; rolling the corpse over, she realizes it is her own son. Ivan orders Fyodor and Malyuta to release Pyotr, the assassin, and thanks him for killing not only "a fool", but "the tsar's worst enemy". He sentences Evfrosinia, who is holding the crown her son was wearing and is singing over his dead body as if deranged. (Back to colour.) At the end, Ivan is seen proclaiming that all his enemies within Moscow are ruthlessly vanquished and he can now turn his attention to those outside.

Cast
Ivan Vasilyevich (Nikolay Cherkasov) – The movies show Ivan more as monarch than man, detailing his struggles to unite Russia and his difficulties in overcoming the traditional, boyar-run government. While not exactly sympathetic, Ivan is shown as having to fight fire with fire—having to be ruthless and brutal for the good of the country. In some ways, he is a victim of the boyars, especially during flashbacks to his childhood and early adolescence. The movies also detail Ivan's gradual slide into suspicion and paranoia. This was the aspect that displeased Stalin.

Efrosinia of Staritsa (Serafima Birman) – Ivan's aunt Efrosinia, usually dressed in black, is the chief villain of the piece, willing to do anything to get her son Vladimir on the throne. She is adamantly traditionalist and hates the Tsarina, relentlessly pushing the other boyars to oppose Ivan in any way they can, and is instrumental in the assassination plot against him. She also foments discord between Ivan and Kurbsky, saying that Ivan plots to kill Kurbsky in the future.

Vladimir of Staritsa (Pavel Kadochnikov) – Vladimir, Efrosinia's adult son with the mind of a child, is the main challenger to Ivan as tsar. He is Ivan's cousin but has none of his intelligence, forcefulness, or drive, and is content to drink and listen to his mother sing.

Malyuta Skuratov (Mikhail Zharov) – Malyuta, Ivan's aide, is shown as one of his secret police. He is the one who suggests executing condemned men quickly to circumvent Philip's attempts at intercession, and is portrayed as sneaky, ruthless, and something of a sycophant.

Alexei Basmanov (Amvrosy Buchma) – The elder Basmanov is a commoner, a self-described hater of the boyars and a great opportunist. He rises to power, commanding armies in the Crimea, and becoming one of Ivan's trusted lieutenants.

Fyodor Basmanov (Mikhail Kuznetsov) – Alexei Basmanov's only son, Fyodor is, at the beginning, awed by the Tsar and his mystique; his personality changes dramatically en route to Part II. After becoming one of the Oprichnina, Fyodor is shown as ruthless, bloodthirsty, and fanatical.

Tsarina Anastasia (Lyudmila Tselikovskaya) – Though she appears only in Part I, the Tsarina is one of her husband's staunchest supporters and is completely loyal to him, rejecting the advances of Prince Kurbsky. She urges Ivan to be firm in dealing with the boyars, which creates enmity toward her. Her murder by the boyars in the hopes of breaking Ivan will lead to Ivan's gradual slide into madness.

Other characters in the story include: Prince Andrew Kurbsky (Mikhail Nazvanov); Boyar Kolychev, afterwards Philip, Metropolitan of Moscow (Andrei Abrikosov); and Pimen, at first Metropolitan of Moscow, afterwards Archbishop of Novgorod (Alexander Mgebrov).

Genesis
During World War II, with the Axis forces approaching Moscow, Eisenstein was one of many Moscow-based filmmakers who were evacuated to Alma Ata, in the Kazakh SSR. There, Eisenstein first considered the idea of making a film about Tsar Ivan IV, aka Ivan the Terrible, whom Joseph Stalin admired as the same kind of brilliant, decisive, successful leader that Stalin considered himself to be. Aware of Eisenstein's interest in a project about Ivan, Stalin ordered the making of the film with Eisenstein as author-director.

The scenario of Ivan the Terrible had been accepted by Mosfilm in the form of two full-length films. Eisenstein considered splitting the screenplay into three parts and discussed this with Grigori Alexandrov, who was against this, but he ended up ignoring Alexandrov's advice and changed the film from two parts to three.

Stalin and Eisenstein met in late February 1947 regarding Ivan the Terrible, Part 2 and they never completed Part 3.

Production

The first film, Ivan The Terrible, Part I, was filmed between 1942 and 1944, and released at the end of that year. The film presented Ivan as a national hero, and won Joseph Stalin's approval (and even a Stalin Prize).

The second film, Ivan The Terrible, Part II: The Boyars' Plot, finished filming at Mosfilm in 1946. The unshown film received heavy criticism from the Central Committee of the Communist Party, calling the picture "anti-historical". The film was finally released in 1958, 10 years after Eisenstein's death.

Cinematography was divided between Eduard Tisse, who shot the exteriors, and Andrei Moskvin, who filmed all interior scenes. The color sequences of Part Two were also filmed by Moskvin.

The score for the films was composed by Sergei Prokofiev. Eisenstein remarked that Prokofiev was able to grasp the emotional mood, rhythm and structure of a scene immediately and have the score ready the next day.

The entire production was shot in Kazakhstan at Mosfilm's substantial production facility in Alma Ata. Although most of the film was shot in black and white, there are color sequences in the second part, making this one of the earliest color films made in the Soviet Union.

Part III
A third film, which began production in 1946, was halted when the decision was made not to release the second film. After Eisenstein's death in 1948, all footage from the film was confiscated, and it was rumored to have been destroyed (though some stills and a few brief shots still exist today).

The screenplay was completed and published copies can be purchased online. The plot was to include Ivan's growing paranoia of his followers (including his betrayal of Fyodor Basmanov) and a battle against Livonian troops which Ivan wins, and thus gains access to the sea for his people.

Style
Eisenstein wrote about Ivan The Terrible’s tone, saying that he wished chiefly to convey a sense of majesty; the actors spoke in measured tones, frequently accompanied by Prokofiev's superb, solemn music, Ivan the Terrible, op. 116.

Nikolai Cherkasov's style of acting was realistic, but highly stylised and intense.  He was said to have been in a state of nervous exhaustion when the filming of the second part of Ivan the Terrible was completed.

Symbolism
Certain symbols are constantly repeated within the film. Notable examples include the single eye which refers to truth. Other symbols include icons, which are symbolic of the Russian Orthodox Church, and then contemporary views of the Church and theology. At the end of Part II during the dance scene, Fyodor wears a mask and cross-dresses as a woman, representing gender confusion and growing debauchery.

Shadows are also used, to visually explain a character's power and control over other characters. This is especially evident in the throne room scene in Part I,  when Ivan's shadow dominates the globe, with all those around him referring to his political power.

Colours are used with precision to add to the overall atmosphere. Almost all of the film is in black-and-white, but at the very end of Part II, just for 10 minutes colour film is used to emphasize the transition from good to bad as well as those scenes' general importance. At the end of the colour part Ivan decides to put his cousin under the assassin's knife by robing him in tsar's dress. The use of black-and-white is here also a visual cue to aid in the dualistic breakdown of characters and their personalities. Certain characters wear colours to refer to their personalities, such Evfrosinia wearing black to visually allude to her evil nature. Beyond that, swans are displayed at two feasts within the film - the first are white, representing innocence and goodness; the second are black, representing the wickedness that has come to pass.

Most of the major characters are portrayed as animals through facial and body gestures, as well as their speech:
 Ivan is portrayed as a bird, with his robes acting as his wings, the constant thrusting and tilting of his head, and the feathery nature of his hair and beard. The bird symbolism will shift from prey to predatory throughout the film.
 Evfrosinia is portrayed like a snake, to reinforce her evil nature. Camera shots always have her coming from the floor up, much like a snake coils up to attack. Her clothing is black, a traditionally evil colour, and she wears a head covering giving her the appearance of a snake's bald head.
 Malyuta is portrayed as a dog to emphasize his loyalty. His hair is designed to mimic a dog's long, floppy ears. His general mannerisms are also dog-like.

Reception
Parts I and II have been polarizing amongst viewers, being included in both  The Fifty Worst Films of All Time (and How They Got That Way) by Harry Medved and Randy Lowell and 1001 Movies You Must See Before You Die, edited by Steven Schneider.

However, the films have since become highly regarded, being awarded 4 out of 4 stars by critic Roger Ebert and included on his list of "Great Movies'. In his 2012 review, Ebert wrote that "the two parts of Eisenstein's "Ivan the Terrible" are epic in scope, awesome in visuals, and nonsensical in story. It is one of those works that has proceeded directly to the status of Great Movie without going through the intermediate stage of being a good movie. I hope earnest students of cinema will forgive me when I say every serious movie lover should see it—once".

The Japanese filmmaker Akira Kurosawa cited this film as one of his 100 favorite films.

Screenplay
 Eisenstein, Sergei M. (1963) Ivan the Terrible: a screenplay; translated by Ivor Montagu and Herbert Marshall; edited by Ivor Montagu. London: Secker / Warburg (published in the US by Simon & Schuster, 1962); includes bibliography

Academic works
 Eisenstein, Sergeii Mikhailovich, et al. The Film Sense. San Diego: Harcourt Brace Jovanovich, 1975. 
 Eisenstein, Sergei, and Jay Leyda. Film Form. San Diego: Harcourt Brace Jovanovich, 1949. 
 Ejzenstejn, Sergej, et al. The Eisenstein Reader. London: British Film Institute, 1998. 
 Neuberger, Joan. Ivan the Terrible. London: I. B. Tauris, 2003.
 Nesbet, Anne. Savage Junctures: Sergei Eisenstein and the Shape of Thinking. City: I. B. Tauris, 2003. 
 Minturn, Neil. The Music of Sergei Prokofiev. New Haven: Yale University Press, 1997. 
 Thompson, Kristin. Eisenstein's "Ivan the Terrible": A Neoformalist Analysis. Princeton: Princeton University Press, 1981. 
 Tsivian, Yuri. Ivan the Terrible. London: B.F.I. Publishing, 2002.

References

External links
 
 
 
 
 
 Ivan the Terrible part I and II at official Mosfilm site with English subtitles
 Ivan the Terrible, Parts I and II an essay by J. Hoberman at the Criterion Collection
 Senses of Cinema article on Ivan the Terrible I and II

1944 films
1940s historical drama films
1940s biographical drama films
Soviet biographical drama films
Soviet black-and-white films
Soviet epic films
Soviet historical drama films
1940s Russian-language films
Russian biographical drama films
Biographical films about Russian royalty
Cultural depictions of Ivan the Terrible
Films scored by Sergei Prokofiev
Films directed by Sergei Eisenstein
Films set in Russia
Films set in Moscow
Films set in Poland
Films set in the 16th century
Films partially in color
Mosfilm films
Censored films
Russian black-and-white films
Films shot in Kazakhstan
Films set in Kraków